"According to You" is the debut single by Australian guitarist and singer Orianthi from her second studio album, Believe. The song was written by Andrew Frampton and Steve Diamond, and produced by Howard Benson. It was released in Australia on 6 October 2009. As it quickly gained popularity, the song was sent to mainstream radio stations in the United States and Canada in November 2009, later making impact at the rhythmic and adult contemporary formats. "According to You" was released in the United Kingdom on 6 September 2010.

The song received acclaim from music critics, who praised her vocal and instrumental talent. The song was also a commercial success, reaching the top 10 in Australia and Japan and the top 20 in the United States. It was also certified Platinum in both territories. "According to You" also charted in Canada, New Zealand, and the United Kingdom. A radio hit, the song reached the top three on the Billboard Pop Songs chart and also appeared on the Adult Contemporary, Adult Pop Songs, and Rhythmic charts.

The song was also made available as a downloadable content for the Rock Band series on 4 May 2010, and as a playable song in Guitar Hero Live.

Composition
"According to You" is a pop rock song with hard rock-styled instrumentation and with a duration of three minutes and nineteen seconds (3:19). It was written by Steve Diamond and Andrew Frampton, and was produced by Howard Benson. According to the digital sheet music published by Kobalt Music Publishing, the song was originally composed in the key of F major and set in common time to an energetic tempo of 130 BPM. Orianthi's vocals span approximately one-and-a-half octaves, from F through C.

The song opens on a soft keyboard riff, which is quickly accompanied by "chugging" power chords on guitar. Orianthi's vocal style on the song has been described as "lively" and has been compared favourably to that of American pop rock artist Kelly Clarkson. The climax of the song is punctuated by a metal guitar solo reminiscent of 1980s pop rock music. Lyrically, "According to You" finds the narrator explaining to an ex-lover all of the differences between him and her new lover, with its hook summarizing that the new man in her life loves her for "everything I'm not, according to you."

Critical reception
The song received generally positive reviews from critics, who noted her talent as both a guitarist and vocalist. Matt Collar of AllMusic praised Orianthi's guitar playing and "gutsy" vocal, describing the song as "one of the poppiest, catchiest radio-friendly" tracks since Kelly Clarkson's "Since U Been Gone" in 2004. Michael Menachem of Billboard wrote that the production, lyrics, and performance all complement one another and suggested that Orianthi's "combination of high-energy, emotive delivery and masterful fret work" could inspire more women to pursue the guitar. In a review of the song's parent album, Believe, Sputnikmusic's Davey Boy wrote that the song's instrumentals "put most radio-rock bands to shame" and called the song catchy. Nick Levine of Digital Spy gave the song five stars and described it as a "whopper of a tune" and a "guilty pleasure."

Music video
An accompanying music video was directed by Marc Klasfeld and begins with Orianthi alone in her bedroom with a guitar for the opening lines of the song. The video then follows her to a photo shoot, a house party where her band is playing and two concerts, as well as a gray room where she is alone during her guitar solos. The video ends as a bookend of the beginning, with her alone again in her room as she plays guitar to herself. It premiered 1 December 2009.

A guitar arm is attached to the camera and is seen throughout the video and is being played by someone as if they are playing Guitar Hero. The video can be watched and played along to on GHTV section of Guitar Hero Live.

Track listing

Charts

Weekly charts

Year-end charts

Certifications

Release history

References

2009 songs
2009 debut singles
Orianthi songs
Torch songs
Music videos directed by Marc Klasfeld
Songs written by Steve Diamond (songwriter)
Songs written by Andrew Frampton (songwriter)
Song recordings produced by Howard Benson
Geffen Records singles